Wim Schepers (25 September 1943 – 25 September 1998) was a Dutch professional road cyclist. A professional from 1966 to 1975, he won two stages of the 1970 Critérium du Dauphiné Libéré and finished second in the 1972 Liège–Bastogne–Liège to Eddy Merckx.

After the final stage of the 1971 Vuelta a España, Schepers was ranked in second place, 19 seconds behind Ferdinand Bracke, but he was given a ten-minute time penalty for a doping offence, and dropped to 15th.

Major results

1965
 1st Stages 1 & 6 Tour of Austria
1966
 1st Manx Trophy
 4th Overall Tour de Luxembourg
1967
 3rd National Road Race Championships
 4th Amstel Gold Race
1968
 4th Rund um den Henninger Turm
 5th Amstel Gold Race
 6th Liège–Bastogne–Liège
 9th Overall Tour of Belgium
1969
 1st Omloop Mandel-Leie-Schelde
 2nd Overall Tour of Belgium
1970
 1st Stages 2a & 2b Critérium du Dauphiné Libéré
 1st Stage 4 Four Days of Dunkirk
 5th Rund um den Henninger Turm
 10th Amstel Gold Race
1971
 10th Overall Tour of Belgium
1972
 2nd Liège–Bastogne–Liège
 4th Rund um den Henninger Turm
 8th La Flèche Wallonne
 9th Gent–Wevelgem
1973
 4th Rund um den Henninger Turm
 10th Züri-Metzgete

References

External links

1943 births
1998 deaths
Dutch male cyclists
People from Stein, Limburg
Cyclists from Limburg (Netherlands)